Zhang Kailin (born 28 January 1990) is a former tennis player from China.

Zhang has won one doubles title on WTA 125 tournaments along five singles and 15 doubles titles on the ITF Circuit. On 12 September 2016, she reached her best singles ranking of world No. 103. On 20 June 2016, she peaked at No. 85 in the doubles rankings.

Partnering Han Xinyun, Zhang won her first $50k tournament in April 2014 at the ITF event in Anning, defeating Varatchaya Wongteanchai and Zhang Ling in the final. Three months later, again on the side of Han, Zhang won her second $50k title in Wuhan.

WTA 125 tournament finals

Doubles: 2 (1 title, 1 runner–up)

ITF Circuit finals

Singles: 14 (5 titles, 9 runner–ups)

Doubles: 21 (15 titles, 6 runner–ups)

References

 
 
 

1990 births
Living people
Chinese female tennis players
Tennis players from Wuhan